Bell is a census-designated place (CDP) in Adair County, Oklahoma, United States. The population was 535 at the 2010 census, an 11.1 percent decline from the figure of 602 recorded in 2000.

Geography
Bell is located at  (35.737087, -94.521859).

Demographics

As of the census of 2000, there were 602 people, 181 households, and 152 families residing in the CDP. The population density was 27.1 people per square mile (10.5/km2). There were 189 housing units at an average density of 8.5/sq mi (3.3/km2). The racial makeup of the CDP was 35.71% White, 0.33% African American, 57.81% Native American, 0.17% from other races, and 5.98% from two or more races. Hispanic or Latino of any race were 0.66% of the population.

There were 181 households, out of which 38.1% had children under the age of 18 living with them, 63.5% were married couples living together, 13.8% had a female householder with no husband present, and 15.5% were non-families. 13.8% of all households were made up of individuals, and 7.2% had someone living alone who was 65 years of age or older. The average household size was 3.33 and the average family size was 3.69.

In the CDP, the population was spread out, with 31.6% under the age of 18, 11.8% from 18 to 24, 26.9% from 25 to 44, 18.6% from 45 to 64, and 11.1% who were 65 years of age or older. The median age was 30 years. For every 100 females, there were 102.0 males. For every 100 females age 18 and over, there were 103.0 males.

The median income for a household in the CDP was $20,000, and the median income for a family was $23,482. Males had a median income of $20,450 versus $14,750 for females. The per capita income for the CDP was $8,753. About 30.5% of families and 35.1% of the population were below the poverty line, including 44.8% of those under age 18 and 37.1% of those age 65 or over.

Bell waterline project
In the early 1980s, the Cherokee Nation, under the direction of Wilma Mankiller (then the director of the Cherokee Nation Community Development Department, later principal chief) and her colleague (and future husband) Charlie Soap, put together a project to build a 16-mile waterline to Bell, where many of the residents still had no indoor plumbing.  The tribe provided equipment and technological assistance, while Bell residents contributed most of the labor on a volunteer basis.  The project drew widespread attention and launched Mankiller's political career. The project is the subject of a 2013 feature film, The Cherokee Word for Water.

School closure and consolidation
In June 2010, after systemic auditing by the Oklahoma state Board of Education, the 200-year-old school district was demanded to be closed by the state. This was due to declared financial impropriety discovered during the auditing process. The Kindergarten through Eighth grade district, composed 97% by Cherokee children, was merged with two separate district. The Stilwell and Belfonte school districts will take fiscal responsibility for the students from the Bell district, and the former Bell school building will remain open.

References

External sources
 Voices of Oklahoma interview with Wilma Mankiller. First person interview conducted on August 13, 2009 with Wilma Mankiller, creator of the Bell Water Project.

Census-designated places in Adair County, Oklahoma
Census-designated places in Oklahoma
Cherokee towns in Oklahoma